Euthera fascipennis is a species of fly in the family Tachinidae. Hosts include Halys dentatus, Apodiphus amygdale, and Dolycoris baccarum.

References 

Diptera of Europe
Diptera of Africa
Diptera of Asia
Insects described in 1854
Dexiinae
Taxa named by Hermann Loew